The Cincinnati Bearcats women's basketball team represents the University of Cincinnati (UC) in women's basketball. The school competes in the American Athletic Conference in Division I of the National Collegiate Athletic Association (NCAA). The Bearcats play in Fifth Third Arena on the UC campus in Cincinnati, Ohio.

Retired jerseys

Season by season results
As of before the 2019–20 season, the Bearcats have a 679–652 record, with four appearances in the NCAA Tournament (1989, 1999, 2002, and 2003) with one Second Round appearance in 2002. They have one conference championship (2002), while finishing runner up in 1999, 2001, and 2003, all while still being in Conference USA.

1.Cancelled due to the Coronavirus Pandemic

NCAA tournament results

References

External links